Lasara Kalan is a village governed by a Gram Panchayat located in Azamgarh district, Uttar Pradesh, India.

References

Villages in Azamgarh district